Terrence "Terry" Kavanagh (born July 9) is an American comic book editor and writer.

Career
Kavanagh was a Marvel Comics editor from 1985 to 1997. Titles he edited during that time included Marvel Comics Presents and Nick Fury, Agent of S.H.I.E.L.D. Writer/artist Alan Davis, who Kavanagh edited on Excalibur, said "Terry Kavanagh spoiled me, gave me near total freedom, and encouraged me to experiment." In 1987, he began to write for Marvel with his first published story "Cry Vengeance!" appearing in Kickers, Inc. #4 (Feb. 1987). He later wrote such titles as Marc Spector: Moon Knight, Avengers: Timeslide, X-Man and X-Universe. In Web of Spider-Man #100 (May 1993), Kavanagh and artist Alex Saviuk gave the lead character "Spider-Armor". He wrote the Spider-Man/Punisher/Sabretooth: Designer Genes one-shot the following month. Kavanagh was one of the writers on the "Maximum Carnage" storyline which ran through the various Spider-Man titles in 1993. The first Black Cat limited series was co-written by Kavanagh and Joey Cavalieri in 1994. Kavanagh pitched a storyline involving the return of Spider-Man's clone, which then formed the basis of the "Clone Saga" which began in Web of Spider-Man #117 (Oct. 1994). Kavanagh's last new comics project was the Before the Fantastic Four: The Storms limited series in 2000–2001.

In 2011, Kavanagh co-founded the internet startup company www.mybeanjar.com.

Bibliography

Marvel Comics

 2099 A.D. #1 (1995) 
 2099 Unlimited #7–8 (1994–1995) 
 All New Exiles #∞, #1–3, 5 (1995–1996) 
 All New Exiles Vs. X-Men #0 (1995) 
 The Amazing Spider-Man #375 (1993)
 The Amazing Spider-Man Super Special #1 (1995) 
 Avengers #396–399 (1996)
 Avengers West Coast #64 (1990) 
 Before the Fantastic Four: The Storms #1–3 (2000–2001)
 Blade: The Vampire-Hunter #9–10 (1995) 
 Cloak and Dagger #16–19 (1991)
 Felicia Hardy: The Black Cat #1–4 (1994)  
 Fury/Agent 13 #1–2 (1998) 
 Hulk #½ (1999) 
 Iron Man #319–332 (1995–1996) 
 Iron Man: Age of Innocence #1 (1996) 
 Kickers, Inc. #4, 6–8, 12 (1987)
 Marc Spector: Moon Knight #35–60 (1992–1994)
 Marvel Comics Presents #5 (Daredevil) (1988) 
 Marvel Super-Heroes vol. 2 #2 (Daredevil) (1990)
 Nightwatch #1–12 (1994–1995)
 Rise of Apocalypse #1–4 (1996–1997)
 The Spectacular Spider-Man #174 (1991) 
 The Spectacular Spider-Man Super Special #1 (1995) 
 Spider-Man #19–20, 25, 36, 41–43 (1992–1994)
 Spider-Man Super Special #1 (1995) 
 Spider-Man Unlimited #1 (1993) 
 Spider-Man/Punisher/Sabretooth: Designer Genes #1 (1993)
 Ultraforce/Avengers Prelude #1 (1995) 
 Uncanny X-Men #369–373, 375–379, 380 (1999–2000)
 Uncanny X-Men '95 #1 (1995) 
 Venom Super Special #1 (1995) 
 Web of Spider-Man #77–80, 97–120, 123–125, Annual #9–10 (1991–1995) 
 Web of Spider-Man Super Special #1 (1995) 
 What If...? #86 (1996)
 X-Man #15–30, −1, 32–47, 49–62 (1996–2000) 
 X-Man '96 #1 (1997) 
 X-Man/Hulk '98 #1 (1998) 
 X-Men #89–94, 97–99 (1999–2000) 
 X-Men '99 Annual #1 (1999) 
 X-Men Spotlight on Starjammers #1–2 (1990)
 X-Men Unlimited #11, 14, 17 (1996–1997)
 X-Universe #1–2 (1995)

References

External links

Terry Kavanagh at Mike's Amazing World of Comics
Terry Kavanagh at the Unofficial Handbook of Marvel Comics Creators

American comics writers
Comic book editors
Living people
Year of birth missing (living people)
Place of birth missing (living people)